Cippico Castle is a castle in Kaštel Novi, a town within the administrative area of Kaštela in Dalmatia, Croatia.

History
In 1512, Pavao Antun Cippico, a nobleman from Trogir, built a fortified summer residence with inclined ground-floor walls and an adjoining fortified village for his labourers from the villages below Mount Kozjak.

References

Castles in Croatia
Buildings and structures in Split-Dalmatia County